The 1989–90 season was Heart of Midlothian's seventh consecutive season in the Scottish Premier Division. Hearts also competed in the Scottish Cup and the Scottish League Cup.

Overview
During the 1989–90 season, Hearts reached the quarter finals of both the Scottish Cup and the Scottish League Cup losing to Celtic and Dunfermline Athletic respectively. After a relatively successful season, finishing third in the Scottish Premier Division.

Scottish Premier Division table

Statistics

Squad information

|}

See also
List of Heart of Midlothian F.C. seasons

References 

1989–90

External links 
 Official club website

Heart of Midlothian F.C. seasons
Heart of Midlothian